Gymnopilus imperialis is a species of mushroom in the family Hymenogastraceae. It was given its current name by mycologist Rolf Singer in 1951.

Description

Habitat and distribution
Gymnopilus imperialis fruitbodies are cespitose (clumped together at the stem), and are found on trunks or at the bases of living or dead frondose trees, especially Eucalyptus species. This species has been observed fruiting in April, October, and December; it is known from Jamaica and Brazil.

See also
List of Gymnopilus species

References

External links
Gymnopilus imperialis at Index Fungorum

imperialis
Fungi of North America